Erythroxylum platyclados, synonyms including Erythroxylum acranthum, is a species of flowering plant in the family Erythroxylaceae, native to parts of eastern Africa and the islands of Aldabra and Comoros. It grows as a tree or shrub. It was first described by Wenceslas Bojer in 1842.

Distribution and habitat
Erythroxylum platyclados is native to Aldabra in Seychelles, the Comoros, Kenya, Madagascar, Mozambique and Tanzania. It mainly grows in seasonally dry tropical habitats.

Conservation
Erythroxylum acranthum was assessed as "vulnerable" in the 1998 IUCN Red List, where it is said to be native only to the Seychelles. , E. acranthum was regarded as a synonym of Erythroxylum platyclados, which has a much wider distribution.

References

platyclados
Flora of Aldabra
Flora of the Comoros
Flora of Kenya
Flora of Madagascar
Flora of Mozambique
Flora of Tanzania
Plants described in 1842